Falard County is in Chaharmahal and Bakhtiari province, Iran. The capital of the county is the city of Mal-e Khalifeh. At the 2006 census, the region's population (as Falard District of Lordegan County) was 30,254 in 6,257 households. The following census in 2011 counted 32,944 people in 8,033 households. At the 2016 census, the district's population was 33,023 in 9,285 households. After the census, it was separated from the county and became Falard County.

Administrative divisions

The population history of Falard County's administrative divisions (as a district of Lordegan County) over three consecutive censuses is shown in the following table.

References

Counties of Chaharmahal and Bakhtiari Province

fa:شهرستان فلارد